Odozana is a genus of moths in the subfamily Arctiinae.

Species
 Odozana cocciniceps E. D. Jones, 1908
 Odozana decepta Schaus, 1911
 Odozana domina Schaus, 1896
 Odozana floccosa Walker, 1864
 Odozana incarnata Jörgensen, 1935
 Odozana inconspicua Schaus, 1911
 Odozana margina Schaus, 1896
 Odozana methaemata Hampson, 1900
 Odozana nigrata Reich, 1933
 Odozana obscura Schaus, 1896
 Odozana patagiata Dognin, 1909
 Odozana roseiceps Rothschild, 1913
 Odozana sixola Schaus, 1911
 Odozana unica Schaus, 1905

References

Lithosiini
Moth genera